Laurent-Honoré Marqueste (Toulouse 12 June 1848 — Paris, 5 April 1920) was a French sculptor in the neo-Baroque Beaux-Arts tradition. He was a pupil of François Jouffroy and of Alexandre Falguière. Marqueste won the Prix de Rome in 1871.

Life
Marqueste was born at Toulouse, 12 June 1848.
He made his official debut at the Paris salon of 1874 (with his painting Jacob and the Angel). 
In 1893, he became a professor at the  École des Beaux-Arts of Paris. In 1884 he received the Legion of Honour (becoming an officer in 1894, and commander in 1903). He became a member of the Institute de France in 1894.

Career
Marqueste's virtuosic work, often combining two figures, tended to be executed by specialist carvers working by pointing up his models, as had become common studio practice among French sculptors in the later nineteenth century.

Among his commissions are a large number of allegorical architectural figural sculptures, historical portraits (Victor Hugo, and Geographie for the Sorbonne, 1901) and others for the monumental Gare d'Orsay (now the Musée d'Orsay), the Beaux-Arts de Paris, the Grand Palais for the 1900 Exposition, and the Hôtel Dufayel, Avenue des Champs-Élysées (1906, demolished). Public monuments by Marqueste are to be found also, in which was very much criticised; as well as monuments for North and South America. He was also the author of portrait busts and statues of Victor Hugo, Léo Delibes, Ferdinand Fabre and a large output of classical subjects. He gained the Grand Prix at the Paris Exposition Universelle of 1900.

He taught at Beaux-Arts de Paris, where his notable students included Fanny Rozet.

His portrait bust, sculpted by Ernest Henri Dubois, is at the Musée des Augustins, Toulouse, which also has a considerable series of statuettes and maquettes, or sculptural sketches. His papers are conserved at the historical department of the Archives Nationales.

Selected works
Velléda (seated figure, 1877) (At the entrance to the Musée des Augustins, Toulouse)
The Sorrow of Orpheus (1879)
Diana Surprised at the Bath (1880)
Cupid (Musée des Augustins, Toulouse)
Galatea (1884)
L'Art et la Fortune (1887)
Nessus and Deianira (1892) (Tuileries Gardens, Paris).
Perseus and the Gorgon 1890. (Musée des Beaux-Arts de Lyon, Palais Saint-Pierre;  Ny Carlsberg Glyptotek, Copenhagen).
La Cigale (1900)
Hebe (1909, shown at the Salon des artistes français)

Notes

External links

 

1848 births
1920 deaths
Prix de Rome for sculpture
Members of the Académie des beaux-arts
20th-century French sculptors
19th-century French sculptors
French male sculptors
19th-century French male artists